Junior Ilunga Makabu (born 8 November 1987) is a Congolese-South African professional boxer. He held the WBC cruiserweight title from 2020 to 2023.

As of June 2022, he is ranked as the world's second-best active cruiserweight by BoxRec, and Fourth by The Ring magazine, and  the Transnational Boxing Rankings Board. He is the older brother of heavyweight boxer Martin Bakole.

Professional career

Early career
His professional career began on 20 June 2008, when he lost four round bouts fighting (by technical knockout in the first round) with the South African boxer Khayeni Hlungwane. The fight was held at the Carousel Hotel & Casino in Temba in the province of North-West. On September 13, 2008 he achieved his first victory, defeating by technical knockout in the first round the representative of Zimbabwe Elvis Moyo. On 19 November 2011 he faced Brazilian Pedro Otas. A twelve-round fight was organized at Monte Casino in Johannesburg, starring Michael Buffer. The dominant Makabu ended the duel by technical knockout in the eleventh round.

WBC Silver cruiserweight champion

Makabu vs. Kudryashov
Makabu was scheduled to fight Dmitry Kudryashov for the vacant WBC Silver cruiserweight title on June 16, 2019, at the KRK Uralets in Yekaterinburg, Russia. The two fighters had a combined 46 knockouts in 47 total fights, which led many media outlets to predict that the fight would end in a finish. Makabu won the fight by a fifth-round technical knockout. Although Kudryashov wasn't knocked down, the stream of undefended punches near the end of the fifth round forced the referee to step in and stop the bout.

Makabu vs. Papin
On July 12, 2019, rumors surfaced that Makabu would defend his WBC Silver title against the undefeated Alexei Papin, who was the #14 ranked IBF cruiserweight contender. On July 30, the WBC confirmed that the fight would take place on the Sergey Kovalev vs. Anthony Yarde undercard, on August 24, 2019, at the Traktor Sport Palace in Chelyabinsk, Russia. Makabu won the fight by majority decision, with two judges scoring the fight 115–113 in his favor, while the third judge scored it as a 113–113 draw. Papin flagged in the mid-rounds, and was nearly finished in the eight round and twelfth rounds.

WBC cruiserweight champion

Makabu vs. Cieślak
Makabu was scheduled to face the undefeated Michał Cieślak for the vacant WBC cruiserweight title on January 31, 2020, at the Temporary Arena in Kinshasa, Democratic Republic of the Congo. Cieślak was originally scheduled to fight Nuri Seferi on December 20, 2019, before he withdrew from that bout to face Makabu for the WBC title on January 18, 2020. Cieslak was ranked #2 by the WBC at cruiserweight. However, due to some disagreements between Makabu and the WBC, the fight was postponed to January 31. Cieślak faced further problems on the day before the fight, as both he and his promoters were robbed at the hotel they were staying at in Kinshasa.

Cieślak had a great start to the fight and appeared close to finishing Makabu in the third round, only for the round to end a full minute early. Makabu rebounded in the fourth round, knocking Cieślak down with two heavy blows, one of which was a blatant uncalled rabbit punch. Cieślak returned the favor in the fifth round, as Makabu was ruled to be in a state of knockdown after he touched the canvas with his glove. Makabu was awarded the unanimous decision after twelve rounds, with scores of 114–112, 115–111 and 116–111.

Makabu vs. Durodola
Makabu made his first defense of his WBC cruiserweight title against the reigning African cruiserweight champion Olanrewaju Durodola at the Studio Mama Angebi in Kinshasa, Congo. Durodola was ranked #3 by the WBC at cruiserweight. He won the fight by a come-from-behind seventh-round knockout. Makabu appeared to be down on the scorecards after the first six rounds were fought, but rallied back to knock Durodola down with a pair of left hooks with a minute to go in the seventh round. Although Durodola managed to beat the eight-count, the referee nonetheless decided to wave off the fight.

Makabu vs. Mchunu
At the WBC Convention on 15 November 2021 in Mexico City, the organization approved the request of Canelo Álvarez's trainer and manager, Eddy Reynoso, to have Álvarez challenge Makabu for his WBC cruiserweight title. Álvarez has never competed at cruiserweight, so Reynoso needed to petition the WBC to order the title fight. The cruiserweight limit was 200 pounds, but it had recently been reduced to 190 pounds due to the introduction of bridgerweight. The fight was expected to take place in May 2022.

Makabu was instead booked to make the second defense of his WBC title against mandatory challenger Thabiso Mchunu on January 29, 2022, at the Packard Music Hall in Warren, Ohio. Mchunu was the number 1 ranked cruiserweight by the WBC and fourth best cruiserweight in the world according to The Ring magazine. The winner of the bout was granted permission to face Canelo Álvarez by the WBC, at the request of Alvarez's team. The fight headlined a Don King promoted card, which was independently broadcast on Fite TV. Makabu won the fight by split decision. Two of the judge scored the bout in his favor (115–113 and 116–112), while the third judge scored it 115–113 for Mchunu. The split decision was seen as controversial, as many news outlets scored the fight for Mchunu. However, Makabu was confident that he had done enough to secure the victory and called out the undisputed super middleweight champion Saul Alvarez in his post-fight interview, stating: "My next fight is with Saul Canelo - I'm going to box and knock you out".

Makabu vs. Jack
Makabu was expected to make his third title defense against the WBA (Regular) cruiserweight champion Ryad Merhy. The fight was scheduled as the main event of a card which took place September 30, 2022, at the Stade des Martyrs in Kinshasa, Congo. On July 19, 2022, Merhy was ordered by the WBA to face their "Super" cruiserweight champion Arsen Goulamirian, while Merhy stated his desire to move up to bridgerweight on August 8, as he was finding it difficult to make the cruiserweight limit.

On December 9, it was revealed that Makabu would make his third title defense against the WBC Silver champion Noel Mikaelian. The bout was expected to take place at the Casino Miami Jai-Alai in Miami, Florida on January 21, 2023. The fight was postponed on January 5, 2023, for undisclosed reasons. Makabu was instead scheduled to defend his title against the two-weight world champion Badou Jack on February 26, 2023, on the Jake Paul vs Tommy Fury undercard. Makabu lost the fight by a twelfth-round technical knockout.

Professional boxing record

See also
List of world cruiserweight boxing champions

References

External links

Ilunga Makabu - Profile, News Archive & Current Rankings at Box.Live

 

|-

|-

1987 births
Living people
Democratic Republic of the Congo male boxers
People from Kananga
21st-century Democratic Republic of the Congo people
Cruiserweight boxers
World cruiserweight boxing champions
World Boxing Council champions